Johan Stålbom (1712 – 17 November 1777) was a Swedish painter.

Stålbom was born at the former town of Karis (now Raseborg), Finland.  He studied from 1733 with the painters Johan Pasch and Lorens Pasch the Elder in Stockholm. From the 1740s he worked and lived mainly in Östergötland, later in his estate Orräng in Grebo, Sweden.

Stålbom primarily painted portraits. The Linköping Diocese library shows a few portraits he has painted. There are only a few of his works that have survived. In the best of his works is displayed skillful drawing, and strong, but not sophisticated colors. His colorings are characterized by a strong reddish color and a greenish or grayish shading.

Johan Stålbom married about 1757 with Susanna Beata Hammardahl. Stålbom died at Grebo in Östergötland, Sweden.

References

Other sources
 Roosval, Johnny, Lilja, Gösta & Andersson, Knut (red). Svenskt konstnärslexikon(1952-1967). Malmö.
 Boo von Malmborg, Svensk porträttkonst under fem århundraden, Allhems Förlag 1978.

External links 
 Johan Stålbom, self portrait.

1712 births
1777 deaths
People from Raseborg
Finnish male painters
Swedish male painters
18th-century Finnish painters
18th-century male artists
18th-century Swedish painters
18th-century Swedish male artists